Elephant crushing, or a training crush, is a method by which wild elephants can be tamed for domestication, using restriction in a cage, sometimes with the use of corporal punishment or negative reinforcement. This practice is condemned by a variety of animal-welfare groups as a form of animal cruelty.

The training crush 
As reported in the 1999 UN Report Gone Astray, in Myanmar and Thailand the "training crush" method involves placing an elephant in a strong, large stall or cage, tied with ropes to keep the elephant from moving, including being unable to kick, raise or swing its head. This method is supposed to crush the elephant's spirit. Proponents argue that this allows the elephant to properly and safely learn the basic command "Still!" or "Quiet!", and enable it to adapt to its new environment.

As quoted in Gone Astray, a 1967 report on a training crush, "An elephant born in captivity is brought up amongst human beings and its training is humane from the day it begins; but a wild beast parted from the herd and its mother must suffer agonies before its will is broken." As it is illegal to take elephants from the wild and the elephant identification system has now made it very difficult to bring in elephants illegally.

Thailand 

Working and performing elephants in Thailand are often poached from Myanmar and trafficked into Thailand. There are around 6,500 elephants currently living in Thailand, with around 2,500 of them being caught from the wild. Therefore, all of these elephants are being held captive solely for tourist attractions disregarding any negative welfare. Trafficked animals can be passed off as being locally reared, with birth and ownership documentation falsified.

Animal welfare advocates have called for better legislation and systems to document the origin of elephants in tourist camps and other locations across Thailand.

Undercover video footage taken in 2019 shows that elephant crushing is still commonly used in Thailand.

Alternatives 
Zoos, including those in countries such as the US, used corporal punishment and negative reinforcement to train elephants until the mid-1970s. A new technique with positive reinforcement, called protected contact or non-dominance is used in modern zoos. The new training uses rewards, not punishment to encourage the behavior of the animal toward the target behavior.

Another alternative is to use trained elephants (called Kumkis in India) to tame, train or chase wild elephants. This practice is widely used in countries such as India.

References

External links 

  Elephant Abuse Charges Add Fuel to Circus Debate, Maryann Mott, National Geographic News, 6 April 2004

Animal training
Elephants
Animal welfare in Thailand
Livestock